(The Emperor of Atlantis or The Disobedience of Death) is a one-act opera by Viktor Ullmann with a libretto by Peter Kien. They collaborated on the work while interned in the Nazi concentration camp of Theresienstadt (Terezín) around 1943. The Nazis did not allow it to be performed there.

The world premiere, presented by the Netherlands Opera at the Bellevue Centre, Amsterdam, took place on 16 December 1975. It was conducted by Kerry Woodward using the first performing edition, which he had been actively involved in preparing.

Composition history
About 1943, Ullmann and Kien were inmates at the Nazi concentration camp of Theresienstadt (Terezín) when they collaborated on the opera. It was rehearsed at Theresienstadt in March 1944, but the Nazi authorities interpreted the work's depiction of the character of the Kaiser as a satire on Adolf Hitler and did not allow it to be performed. Both the composer and the librettist were murdered in the Auschwitz concentration camp.

Ullmann entrusted his manuscripts to a fellow-prisoner, Dr. Emil Utitz, a former Professor of Philosophy at the German University in Prague, who served as the camp's librarian. Utitz survived the camp and passed the manuscripts on to another survivor, Dr. Hans Gunther Adler, a friend of Ullmann's, some of whose poems Ullmann had set to music. The score was a working version with edits, substitutions, and alternatives made in the course of rehearsals. Dr. Adler deposited the original manuscripts and two copies of the libretto in his possession at the Goetheanum in Dornach, the center for the anthroposophical movement with which Ullmann was associated. The manuscripts subsequently passed to the Paul Sacher Stiftung in Basle.

Performance history
First performing edition

The first performing edition of the work was prepared between 1973 and 1975 by Kerry Woodward, a London-based musician and arranger who had a personal connection with the Adler family. Woodward worked through the nearly complete orchestra score, loose pages of additional music, and two copies of the libretto, one version in Ullmann’s handwriting and the other one typed.

Using an English translation prepared by the poet Aaron Kramer, the San Francisco Spring Opera Theater led by Woodward presented the American premiere of the piece on 21 April 1977. Woodward also led the New York premiere with the New Opera Theatre at the Brooklyn Academy of Music on 19 May 1977 and five performances in Israel in May 1978. He continued to perform the work with the DNO both in Amsterdam the following month and at the Nottingham Playhouse in Nottingham, England a year later. In addition to these early stage performances, a feature film of the opera performed by the London Sinfonietta was released in 1977. John Goldschmidt directed the film, and the orchestra was led by Woodward and starred Teresa Stratas and Siegmund Nimsgern. The film won the Prix Italia (RAI Prize) a year later.

Towards the end of 1976 and into 1977, Woodward consulted Rosemary Brown, a prominent spiritualist known for mediumship with dead composers and for transcribing musical works they dictated. According to transcriptions of their sessions together, Brown claimed that she was in contact with Ullmann, who wanted to make changes in the score. Brown communicated these instructions to Woodward, who incorporated them into a revised edition for later performances. These changes included altering the instrumentation of the second part of Death's aria near the end of the opera, substituting strings for harpsichord and adding trumpet and flute.

Other performing editions and performances

In 1981, Michael Graubart and Nicholas Till prepared an edition based on the manuscripts in Dr. Adler's possession as well as on Woodward's edition, following many of Woodward's choices. That provided the basis for the British premiere at the Studio Theatre of London's Morley College on 15 May 1981 and for additional performances in May 1985 at the Imperial War Museum.

In 1988, Mecklenburgh Opera produced the UK's first professional production at the Donmar Warehouse Theatre. It was directed by John Abulafia who commissioned a new English translation by Sonja Lyndon. The conductor was Anne Manson. The designer was Chris Baugh. The Mecklenburgh production was revived at the South Bank Centre and toured to Scotland. Mecklenburgh Opera's production won the Prudential Award. The 1993 BBC TV film 'The Music of Terezín' by Simon Broughton incorporated scenes from Mecklenburh Opera's production of 'Der Kaiser von Atlantis' in German.

Ingo Schultz worked on the reconstruction of the opera's score between 1992 and 1993 in cooperation with Karel Berman, who rehearsed the role of Death at Terezín and had a copy of the score he had made by hand, Paul Kling, who was the concertmaster of the chamber-orchestra of the rehearsals at Terezín 1944, and Herbert Thomas Mandl. Hindemith (Austria) staged this edition of the opera in Austria, the Czech Republic (including the first performance at the concentration camp of Theresienstadt in 1995), Germany, Sweden, Canada, and the U.S. (including a performance at the U.S. Holocaust Memorial Museum).

Tomasz Konina directed the Polish premiere at Warsaw Chamber Opera in Warsaw in 2005.

Other performances have been given by Ravinia Festival at Temple Shalom in Chicago (2005), City Opera of Vancouver (2009), Long Beach Opera (2009), Boston Lyric Opera (2011), Dioneo Opera (Grimeborn, London, 2011), and English Touring Opera in London and locations throughout England (2012). It was presented in Denver, Colorado, by Central City Opera, in collaboration with other Denver organizations, in January 2013. The New Millennium Orchestra, in collaboration with the City of Chicago's Department of Cultural Affairs, presented the opera in March 2013 on the Pritzker stage of Millennium Park. It was performed in Melbourne at Monash University's Caulfield campus in July 2012 by IOpera, and by Perth Hebrew Congregation, Perth, Western Australia, in June 2014, by Lostandfound Opera Juilliard Opera Center performed the work (in a double bill with Poulenc's ) in November 2015. The Dutch M31 Foundation made a small documentary with all the old cast members of the first performance and performed the work in 2016 with a new cast in several theatres in the Netherlands. In October 2020, the Atlanta Opera produced socially distanced performances of the work outdoors in a circus tent.

Roles

Critical appreciation
Descriptions and summaries of Kien's libretto vary widely. John Rockwell described the opera as a story of "the abdication of death in the face of life's universal horrors." Harold Schonberg thought that "the play is stronger and more interesting than the music....In several spots the Ullmann work almost makes it as an opera." Most summaries report that Death insists that the Emperor be the first to die, but others emphasize the ending in which "miraculously, the Emperor comes to understand his crimes" and "to allow Death to save millions from the agony of life-without-death, he offers himself as Death's first victim."

In an interview, conductor James Conlon, a prominent reviver of works lost in the Holocaust, described the opera as both a political satire and a parable of hope in which the isolated Emperor represents Hitler and the Drummer his confidante Eva Braun. The young lovers and Harlequin embody "the lost world of normal human emotion."

Andrew Porter has described the text of the opera:
The plot is no cut-and-dried allegory but an elusive death-welcoming parable about a mad, murderous ruler, possibly redeemed at last, who says farewell to the world in a mock-Faustian vision of a natural paradise no longer spoiled by men; had his dream come true all men would be dead. The Emperor of Atlantis, ruler over much of the world, proclaims universal war and declares that his old ally Death will lead the campaign. Death, offended by the Emperor's presumption, breaks his sabre; henceforth men will not die. Confusion results: a Soldier and a Girl-Soldier from opposite sides sing a love duet instead of fighting; the sick and suffering find no release. Death offers to return to men on one condition–that the Emperor be the first to die. He accepts and sings his farewell.

Synopsis
Prologue

A voice heard over a loudspeaker sets the scene and presents the characters.

Scene 1

Harlequin describes his sorry life without laughter or love. Death joins him and together they lament how slowly time passes in their grim environment.
Death belittles Harlequin's wish to die and explains how much more dire his own situation is than that of Harlequin. He lacks respect now that "motorized chariots of war" have replaced him, the "old fashioned craftsman of dying," and work him to exhaustion with little satisfaction.

The Drummer announces the latest decree of the Emperor: Everyone will be armed and everyone will fight until there are no survivors. Death denounces the Emperor for usurping his role: "To take men's souls is my job, not his!" He declares that he is on strike and breaks his saber.

Scene 2

In his palace, the Emperor gives battle orders and monitors the progress of the universal war. He learns of a man who continues to live eighty minutes after being hanged and shot. The Loudspeaker reports that thousands of soldiers are "wrestling with life at this very moment, doing their best to die" without success. Fearful that his power will not endure without death, the Emperor announces that he has decided to reward his subjects with the gift of eternal life. More honestly, he asks: "Death, where is thy sting? Where's thy victory, Hell?"

Scene 3

A Soldier and Bubikopf (the Bobbed-Hair Girl) confront one another as enemies. Unable to kill each other, their thoughts turn to love. They dream of distant places where kind words exist alongside meadows "filled with color and fragrance". The Drummer attempts to lure them back to battle with the sensual attraction of the call. The Maiden responds: "Now Death is dead and so we need to fight no more!" She and the Soldier sing: "Only love can unite us, unite us all together."

Scene 4

The Emperor continues to oversee his failing realm, where his subjects angrily protest their suspension in limbo between life and death. Harlequin appeals to him, reminding him of his innocent childhood. The Drummer urges the Emperor to maintain his resolve, but the Emperor's memories turn his thoughts from his plans for the annihilation of all. Instead he gazes into a covered mirror and asks: "What do men look like? Am I still a man or just the adding machine of God?"

He pulls away the mirror's cloth and faces the reflection of Death. "Who are you?" he demands. Death describes his role modestly, like that of a gardener "who roots up wilting weeds, life's worn-out fellows." He regrets the pain his strike is causing. When the Emperor asks him to resume his duties, Death proposes a resolution to the crisis: "I am prepared to make peace, if you are prepared to make a sacrifice: will you be the first one to try out the new death?" After some resistance, the Emperor agrees and the suffering people find release in death once more. The Emperor sings his farewell. In a closing chorus, Death is praised and asked to "teach us to keep your holiest law: Thou shalt not use the name of Death in vain now and forever!"

Music
The score comprises 20 short sections and lasts about fifty minutes. Parts of it are danced and there are long spoken sections. The 1943 orchestration is for chamber ensemble and includes such unusual instruments as banjo and harmonium. Alto saxophone and harpsichord also appear. Ullmann used the famous Lutheran chorale "Ein feste Burg ist unser Gott" as a melodic motif as well as a theme from the Asrael symphony of Josef Suk. Critics list among Ullmann's antecedents and influences "the radical young Hindemith" as well as Kurt Weill and Arnold Schoenberg. One critic has said Ullmann employed "an omnivorous musical language that draws on both classical and popular styles." The work ends with the chorale to the text "Come, Death, who art our worthy guest."

The character of Harlequin recites two poems Kien had written earlier. The first describes a cold and pitiless moon, linking him to Pierrot, a character from the commedia dell'arte known for being moonstruck and a sleepwalker.  Later he sings a lullaby that uses a text Kien wrote as a paraphrase of another lullaby text, one familiar to all his contemporaries in the camp, that had been sung during the Thirty Years' War. Ullmann set it to a catchy melody composed by Johann Friedrich Reichardt in 1781.

Recordings
Audio
 1993: Michael Kraus, Franz Mazura, Martin Petzold, Herbert Lippert, Christiane Oelze, Walter Berry, Iris Vermillion; Leipzig Gewandhaus Orchestra; Lothar Zagrosek, conductor. Decca 440 854-2. This recording uses expanded orchestration and replaces the harpsichord with piano.
 1997: Stephen Swanson, Rupert Bergmann, Johannes Strasser, Stefani Kahl, Krassimir Tassev, Ingrid Niedermayr; ARBOS – Company for Music and Theatre Gesellschaft für Musik und Theater/Ensemble Kreativ; Alexander Drčar, conductor; Herbert Gantschacher, producer. Studio Matouš 0022-2 631. This recording uses the original instrumentation.
 2022: Adrian Eröd, Lars Woldt, Johannes Chum, Juliana Zara, Tareq Nazmi, Christel Loetzsch; Munich Radio Orchestra; Patrick Hahn, conductor. BR-Klassik 900339.

Films
 1977: The Emperor of Atlantis. German TV film, directed by John Goldschmidt, starring Teresa Stratas and Siegmund Nimsgern, performed by the London Sinfonietta, conducted by Kerry Woodward, 57 minutes. Plus short introductory documentary on the origin of the opera based on an interview with H.G. Adler, illustrated with drawings by concentration camp inmates. WDR/BBC/Clasart.
 2007: Viktor Ullmann – Way to the Front 1917, documentary film. Directed and written by Herbert Gantschacher; editor: Erich Heyduck. ARBOS-DVD Vienna-Salzburg-Klagenfurt-Arnoldstein.
 2009: The Emperor of Atlantis or The Disobedience of Death, documentary music theatre about the opera by Viktor Ullmann. Directed and written by Herbert Gantschacher; sound-engineering: Roumen Dimitrov; editor: Erich Heyduck ARBOS-DVD Vienna-Salzburg-Klagenfurt.

See also
The Holocaust in art and literature
List of anti-war songs

References
Notes

Sources
Beaumont, Antony (2001), in Holden, Amanda (Ed.), The New Penguin Opera Guide, New York: Penguin Putnam. 

Unknown author (26 April 1977), "From the archive: Death takes a holiday", The Guardian (London), 26 April 1977; reprinted on 26 April 2014
 Herbert Gantschacher Viktor Ullmann – Zeuge und Opfer der Apokalypse / Witness and Victim of the Apocalypse / Testimone e vittima dell'Apocalisse / Svědek a oběť apokalypsy / Prič in žrtev apokalipse. ARBOS-Edition, Arnoldstein – Klagenfurt – Salzburg – Vienna – Prora – Prague 2015, 

Other sources
Conway, James (2012), "The Emperor of Atlantis: Director's Notes", in English Touring Opera's Autumn 2012 programme book, pp. 22 – 23.
Fligg, David (Ph.D.) (2012), "Creativity in Adversity" in English Touring Opera's Autumn 2012 programme book, pp. 24 – 29.

External links
 Barnett, Rob, Review of Studio Matouš recording, October 2003 on musicweb-international.com
 Connolly, Kate, "Viktor Ullmann's opera written in Nazi concentration camp revived in Berlin", The Guardian (London), 24 May 2013
 Herman, David, "Ghosts of Terezin", The Guardian (London) 5 September 2003
 Reynolds, Mike, Review of 2012 English Touring Opera performance on musicalcriticism.com
 Catalog Listing of Original 1975 Vocal Score (Woodward) at The Paul Sacher Stiftung
  streamed by the Jewish Music Institue on Holocaust Memorial Day 2021, with a Q&A with director Simon Broughton.

Operas
German-language operas
One-act operas
1943 operas
1975 operas
Operas by Viktor Ullmann
Death in music
Atlantis in fiction